The FIDE Online Arena is the International Chess Federation's (FIDE) official exclusive Internet chess server devoted to chess playing and related activities. A test version of the server began on August 8, 2013; the fully operational version was announced for October 2013. FIDE Online Arena is the only official online chess platform of the World Chess Federation where Online Official games, tournaments and World Championships can be played, with Official International rating and titles.

The fully operational version of FIDE online arena was launched on April 4, 2014 with the announcement made by FIDE President Kirsan Ilyumzhinov. Games played between two FIDE online arena members will be for FIDE online ratings. A plan to merge online and over-the-board FIDE ratings for the blitz and rapid time controls in the future was also announced. 

The new version of the iOS app has been released in 2021. 

According to a September 2015 internal report, there were  4805 members, 2078 paying the subscription fee, with India the most populous.

On January 7, 2016, the first newsletter was published, with plans for events in 2016, promising to engage all chess fans to a unique gaming experience, along with the New Era that has come along with rated Online games and Arena titles. "Arena titles are going to be included in monthly FIDE rating lists starting from January 2016. As official FIDE titles they can precede the players’ names in over the board competitions as well." 

In 2019, the Arena has been acquired and is now managed by World Chess, the company that organized the World Chess Championship Matches in 2014, 2016, and 2018. In September of 2021, both World Chess and FIDE announced that the Arena ratings and titles will be included in the official players’ profiles on FIDE website.

See also
List of Internet chess servers

References

External links
 FIDE Online Arena - Homepage

Internet chess servers
Chess websites